Celso Luiz Scarpini (27 November 1944 – 23 September 2022) was a Brazilian basketball player. He competed in the men's tournament at the 1968 Summer Olympics.

References

1944 births
2022 deaths
Brazilian men's basketball players
Olympic basketball players of Brazil
Basketball players at the 1968 Summer Olympics
Sportspeople from Porto Alegre